Maneyapanda Muthanna Somaya (born 8 May 1959) is a former Indian field hockey player and was employed with Bharat Petroleum Corp Ltd. As a field hockey player, he was captain of the Indian national team and played as a halfback. He played in 3 Olympic Games in 1980, 1984 and 1988. He was a member of the Gold medal winning team in 1980 and captained the Indian team at the 1988 Seoul Olympics. 

Somaya was a member of India squad that won the gold medal at the 1980 Moscow Olympics. He went on to play in two more Olympic Games — the 1984, and the 1988, captaining the side in the latter event. Somaya had a successful corporate career after his playing days with Bharat Petroleum. In 2007, he was bestowed the Life Time Achievement award by the Petroleum Sports Promotion Board. He is also a recipient of Arjuna Award.

Biography 
Somaya studied at St. Mary's School in Mumbai (then Bombay) and completed his college education in the city's St. Xavier's College. He credited the "Jesuit system of education, where they place equal focus on sports, academics and extra-curricular activities" for his career in sports. He was picked in the national squad for the 1980 Moscow Olympics.

In 1983, for the Silver Jubilee 10-Nation Cup in Hong Kong, Somaya was named captain.He was also captain of the Indian team at the 1985 Asia Cup, Dhaka.  He captained the team that won the Peugeot Cup, Nairobi, 1988 and also led the team in the drawn India-Pak series in 1988.   Somaya's only goal in the 1986 World Cup came against Spain in the group stage match.

Somaya was employed with Bharat Petroleum (BPCL) during his playing days, and after retirement, went through several programs from institutions such as Indian School of Business, Wharton School of the University of Pennsylvania and Arthur D. Little. He retired in 2017 as executive director of BPCL's aviation fueling and lubricant businesses.

See also
 List of Indian hockey captains in Olympics
 Field hockey in India

References

External links
 

1959 births
Living people
Olympic field hockey players of India
Olympic gold medalists for India
Field hockey players at the 1980 Summer Olympics
Field hockey players at the 1984 Summer Olympics
Field hockey players at the 1988 Summer Olympics
Kodava people
Recipients of the Arjuna Award
People from Kodagu district
Field hockey players from Karnataka
Indian male field hockey players
Medalists at the 1980 Summer Olympics
Asian Games medalists in field hockey
Field hockey players at the 1982 Asian Games
Field hockey players at the 1986 Asian Games
Asian Games silver medalists for India
Asian Games bronze medalists for India
Medalists at the 1982 Asian Games
Medalists at the 1986 Asian Games
Olympic medalists in field hockey